Sopranino indicates a tonal range higher than soprano, and can refer to:

Music
 Sopranino clarinet or E-flat clarinet
 Sopranino recorder
 Sopranino saxophone
 Sopranino voice, with a range higher than soprano

Other
 Sopranino, a 1950 ultralight sailboat, the pattern for later classes, now preserved at the Classic Boat Museum at Cowes, Isle of Wight

See also
 Soprano (disambiguation)